Xerodes contiguaria is a species of moth of the family Geometridae first described by John Henry Leech in 1897. It is found in Taiwan and China.

References

Moths described in 1897
Ennominae